The 1955–56 Ohio Bobcats men's basketball team represented Ohio University as a member of the Mid-American Conference in the college basketball season of 1955–56. The team was coached by Jim Snyder and played their home games at the Men's Gymnasium. The Bobcats finished the regular season with a record of 13–11 and finished fifth in the MAC regular season with a conference record of 5–7.

Schedule

|-
!colspan=9 style=| Regular Season

Source:

Statistics

Team Statistics
Final 1955–56 Statistics

Source

Player statistics

Source

References

Ohio Bobcats men's basketball seasons
Ohio
Ohio Bobcats men's basketball
Ohio Bobcats men's basketball